Red Willow Lake may refer to:

Red Willow Reservoir, McCook, Nebraska
Red Willow Lake, North Dakota